Chelsea Nikkel, better known by her stage name Princess Chelsea, is a producer and musician from Auckland, New Zealand, and a previous member of twee pop band the Brunettes and Auckland band Teenwolf. Nikkel is associated with the Lil' Chief Records collective and is a part-time member of Auckland soul group the Cosbys and Disciples of Macca, a Paul McCartney covers band featuring members of the Brunettes, Ruby Suns, Bressa Creeting Cake and Lawrence Arabia and more recently performs as bass player in three-piece rock'n'roll band, Hang Loose.

Her baroque musical style has been attributed to her classical training, and the New Zealand Herald praised her "angelic vocals and acerbic wit". Her best known song, "The Cigarette Duet" received significant press exposure after its video went viral on YouTube in early 2012, recently reaching over 80 million views. This led to her being featured on The Guardian's "New Band of the Day".

Chelsea's song "World Turns Grey" was remixed in a collaboration with the German electronic music producer, Robin Schulz. The remix is on the album Sugar released by Schulz in September 2015.

In August 2016, she made a cover of a song called "Cold Glass Tube" by the Reduction Agents, which is available on the album Waiting for Your Love: A Tribute to the Reduction Agents. The album was released on iTunes on 19 August.

Discography

Albums
 Lil' Golden Book (2011)
 The Great Cybernetic Depression (2015)
 Aftertouch (2016)
 The Loneliest Girl (2018)
 Everything Is Going to Be Alright  (2022)

EPs
 The Cigarette Duet (European Tour Edition) (2012)

Singles

Music videos

References

External links

Radio Interview

Musical groups established in 2009
New Zealand women singer-songwriters
21st-century New Zealand women singers
New Zealand women in electronic music
Living people
Musicians from Auckland
Year of birth missing (living people)
Indie pop musicians